Ellenshaw is a surname. Notable people with the surname include: 

 Harrison Ellenshaw (born 1945), American matte painter
 Peter Ellenshaw (1913–2007), English matte designer and special effects creator, father of Harrison